Cockamamie is the debut album from Boston-based musician Jen Trynin.  First released in 1994, the album failed to do well on the charts when re-released by Warner Bros. Records in 1995, in spite of positive reviews. The track "Better Than Nothing" was released as a single from the album.

The story of how this album came to be and the process regarding its release on Warner Bros. is chronicled in Trynin's 2006 book Everything I'm Cracked Up to Be.

Track listing
All songs written by Jen Trynin.
 "Happier" 
 "Better Than Nothing"
 "Everything Is Different Now"
 "One Year Down"
 "Snow"
 "All This Could Be Yours"
 "Too Bad You're Such A Loser"
 "Knock Me Down"
 "If I Had Anything To Say (Don't You Think I Would Have Said It All?)"
 "Beg"
 "Do It Alone"
  there is an untitled hidden track that begins at 4:07

Personnel
 Paul Bryan - bass
 Jerry Deupree - drums
 David Gregory - drums
 Mike Levesque - drums
 Aimee Mann - vocals
 Michael Rivard - bass
 Clayton Scoble - backing vocals
 Milt Sutton - drums, percussion
 Jennifer Trynin - guitar, vocals

Appearances in media
 All This Could Be Yours appears in the 2019 film Raising Buchanan

References

External links

Jen Trynin's webpage

1994 debut albums
1995 debut albums
Jen Trynin albums
Warner Records albums